Kleszczewo-Osada  is a settlement in the administrative district of Gmina Miłki, within Giżycko County, Warmian-Masurian Voivodeship, in northern Poland.

The settlement did not exist before 1945 and can be translated as Kleszczewo-settlement or Brassendorf-Siedlung.

References

Kleszczewo-Osada